Philippe Pierre Gaston François Nozières (12 April 1932 – 15 June 2022) was a French physicist working at Institut Laue-Langevin in Grenoble, France.

He was born on 12 April 1932 in Paris
and died on 15 June 2022, aged 90.

Education 
In 1952, Nozières began his scientific career working on semiconductor experiments in the group of Pierre Aigrain at the École Normale Supérieure in Paris. He wrote a master's thesis on the point-contact transistor. In 1955, received a fellowship study with David Pines at Princeton University, working on many-body theory. He spent the summer of 1956 at Bell Labs, where he exchanged ideas with a variety of condensed matter theorists, including Philip W. Anderson and Walter Kohn He received his Ph.D. from the University of Paris in 1957 for the work he carried out at Princeton.

Academic career 
In 1957 Nozières was appointed the assistant director of the physics laboratory at the École Normale Supérieure. In 1958 his academic career was interrupted when he was drafted by the French navy. He spent 2 years working on seismic detectors intended to sense atomic explosions. After leaving the navy in 1961, he became a professor at the University of Paris.  He left Paris to join the Institut Laue-Langevin in Grenoble in 1972, and would continue to be associated with this institution for the rest of his career. In 1976 he became a professor at the University of Grenoble. In 1983 he became a professor at the Collège de France.

Research 
Nozières’ work has been concerned with various facets of the many-body problem. He made major contributions to understand the fundamental theory of solids, especially to the behavior of electrons in metals. In a short period, he has contributed profoundly to the concept of quasiparticles and its relation to Fermi liquids, to the dynamics of local systems in metals, to irreversible phenomena in quantum physics. Through his book (N-body problem) and his research, he has established a French school in solid state physics during the last 20 years whose influence extends all over the world. His work lately focused on crystal growth and surface physics.

Awards 
Nozières has been recognized with a variety of awards for his seminal work. In 1988 he received the CNRS Gold medal. In 1984/85 he was awarded the Wolf Prize in Physics, along with Conyers Herring of Stanford University, for "their major contributions to the fundamental theory of solids, especially of the behaviour of electrons in metals". In 1974 he won the F. Holweck Prize. In 1961 he won the CNRS Silver Medal, and in 1960 the Prix Langevin from the Societe Francaise de Physique.

In 1989 he became a Commandeur de l'Ordre National du Mérite. He is a member of the French Academy of Sciences and a foreign associate of the US National Academy of Sciences.

References

External links 
 Books written by Philippe Nozieres
 The Wolf Prize in Physics in 1984/85
 Profile on The Academy of Europe website

1932 births
2022 deaths
French physicists
École Normale Supérieure alumni
Wolf Prize in Physics laureates
Members of the French Academy of Sciences
Foreign associates of the National Academy of Sciences
University of Paris alumni
Academic staff of Grenoble Alpes University
Academic staff of the University of Paris
Princeton University people